Hellner is a surname. Notable people with the surname include:

 Jacob Hellner (born 1961), Swedish music producer
 Johannes Hellner (1866–1947), Swedish politician
 Marcus Hellner (born 1985), Swedish cross country skier
 Nils Hellner (born 1965), German archaeologist

Surnames of Swedish origin